The BMW C600 Sport and C650GT are maxi-scooters produced by BMW Motorrad. They are the company's first scooter since the C1, which was manufactured by Bertone. The line was announced by BMW at EICMA in late 2010. Current members of the series are the C600 Sport and the C650 GT, both powered by 647 cc parallel twin gasoline engines. 
Production began at BMW's Spandau plant in December 2011, 
and they were expected to be available in Europe in Spring 2012, 
and in the US in Fall 2012 for the 2013 model year. BMW has shown an electric motorcycle concept vehicle based on a similar size frame and similar styling.

The C-series engine is built by Kymco company in Taiwan.

The front wheel fender is directing the road dirt to radiator which generates clogging issue and engine overheating.

Reports have stated BMW expects three quarters of sales to be to buyers in southern Europe.

References

External links

C600 Sport at BMW Motorrad International
C650GT at BMW Motorrad International

Maxi scooters
C600
Motorcycles introduced in 2012
Motorcycles powered by straight-twin engines